Sam Greenwood (born October 11, 1988) is a Canadian professional poker player from Toronto, Ontario, who used to work as a stock trader. He made his first high roller poker tournament score in the $97,000 No Limit Hold'em Super High Roller 8 Handed event at the 2015 PokerStars Caribbean Adventure tournament series.

Poker 
Sam Greenwood has started online poker in 2006 on PokerStars. 

Greenwood plays online at nicknames Str8$$$Homey on PokerStars, IfHeDiesHeDies on Full Tilt Poker, DeanMalenko on partypoker and FlatTopTony on 888poker. He has won over $6 million in online poker tournaments, with nearly $3.5 million on PokerStars and over $1 million on Full Tilt and partypoker. In September 2009, he won a title at the World Championship of Online Poker on PokerStars. In May 2013, he scored his highest online prize money by winning Event 22 $2,100 NL Hold'em in the Spring Championship of Online Poker on PokerStars winning $377,280.

Greenwood has been playing live tournaments since 2008. He won his first WSOP bracelet in the $1,000 No-Limit Hold'em Event at the 2015 World Series of Poker, winning $318,977.

In January 2019, Greenwood won the PokerStars Caribbean Adventure $100,000 Super High Roller event defeating Henrik Hecklen heads up and winning $1,775,460.

In September 2019, Sam Greenwood won the British Poker Open £10K Short Deck tournament, defeating Robert Flink heads up and winning £110,400.

As of September 2020, Greenwood has won over $22,000,000 in live poker tournaments making him the third most successful Canadian poker player, behind Daniel Negreanu and Jonathan Duhamel.

World Series of Poker Bracelets

Personal life 
Greenwood lives in Toronto. His twin brother Lucas and older brother Max are also professional poker players.

References

External links

 Sam Greenwood Hendon Mob results

1988 births
Canadian poker players
Living people
Sportspeople from Toronto